The Municipal President of Puebla (mayor) is the head of local government in the municipality of Puebla, in the Mexican state of Puebla. The mayor's authority includes the state capital, the  city of Puebla. Since the city serves as the municipal seat and is home to the majority of the municipality's population, the position of municipal president is frequently identified with the city, rather than the municipality.

List of municipal presidents of Puebla

  1945–1948: Antonio Arellano Garrido
  1948–1951: Enrique Milina Jhonson
  1951–1954: Nicolás Vázquez Arriola
  1954–1957: Arturo Perdomo Morán
  1957–1960: Rafael Artasanchez Romero
  1957–1960: Francisco Rodríguez Pacheco
  1960–1963: Eduardo Cué Merlo
  1963–1966: Carlos Vergara Soto
  1966–1969: Arcadio Medel Marín
  1969–1972: Carlos J. Arruti y Ramírez
  1972: Gonzalo Bautista O'Farrill
  1972–1975: Luis Vázquez Lapuente
  1975–1978: Eduardo Cué Merlo
  1978–1981: Miguel Quiróz Pérez
  1981–1984: Victoriano Álvarez García
  1984–1987: Amado Camarillo Sánchez
  1984–1987: Jorge Murad Macluf
  1987–1990: Guillermo Pacheco Pulido
  1990–1993: Marco Antonio Rojas Flores
  1993–1996: Rafael Cañedo Benítez
  1996–1999: Gabriel Hinojosa Rivero
  1999–2002: Mario Marín Torres
  2002–2005: Luis Jesús Paredes Moctezuma
  2005–2008: Enrique Doger Guerrero
  2008–2011: Blanca Alcalá Ruiz
  2011–2014: Eduardo Rivera Pérez

See also
 Timeline of Puebla

References
 Cronología de los Presidentes Municipales

Government of Puebla
Puebla
Puebla (city)
Politicians from Puebla